Gloddfa Ganol (also known as the Gloddfa Ganol Mountain Center) was a museum dedicated to the Welsh slate industry and narrow-gauge railways, situated in the Oakeley slate quarry in Blaenau Ffestiniog. It opened in 1974 and closed in 1998 following an auction of its exhibits.

Gloddfa Ganol Mountain Center 
The Oakeley slate quarry was the largest underground slate mine in the world, but it suffered from a sharp decline in worldwide demand for slate after the Second World War. As quarrying declined in the 1970s, the owners sought to diversify to serve the growing tourist trade in Wales. In 1974 the abandoned Middle Quarry was re-opened, producing architectural slab, and as an attraction to the public - the Gloddfa Ganol Mountain Center. The centre offered guided tours of several miles of underground tunnels and chambers and was based in the old Middle Mill, which had been rebuilt for the purpose.

Rich Morris collection 
Railway enthusiast Rich Morris began collecting narrow gauge rolling stock in 1963, when he purchased a metre gauge Ruston Proctor locomotive from a china clay mine in St Austell. He continued to purchase locomotives from across the United Kingdom, initially storing items at his house in Bampton in Oxfordshire. In 1974, he moved to Longfield in Kent, but the collection soon outgrew the storage capacity of his garden. In 1976, Morris arranged to move some of his locomotives to Pen-yr-Orsedd slate quarry in North Wales where he planned to set up a museum to exhibit his collection and tell the story of narrow gauge industrial railways.

Pen-yr-Orsedd was owned by The Festiniog Group, which owned several slate quarries across North Wales. In 1977, the company consolidated their activities in their quarries in Blaenau Ffestiniog and closed down Pen-yr-Orsedd. They offered space to the Morris collection at their largest quarry, Oakeley.

The Narrow Gauge Railway Centre 

A new company, Narrow Gauge Enterprises, was set up to oversee the new museum at Gloddfa Ganol. Morris moved most of his collection to the Gloddfa Ganol Mountain Centre starting in May 1978, with the majority being moved on five articulated lorries on 23 June. Some exhibits initially went into storage in an annexe in Blaenau Ffestiniog. As well as Morris' collection, locomotives belonging to Pete Nicholson were moved from the Brockham Railway Museum near Dorking on 18 July. By September of that year, all the equipment had been moved from Pen-yr-Orsedd, and more than 70 locomotives were on site.

The collection was initially housed in a new Exhibition Hall, with some locomotives scattered outside. This hall was adapted from the disused winding house of the Dafydd Glanamarch incline. 

Around 1985 Holland's Lower Mill, which had been demolished many years previously, was rebuilt and the railway collection was moved there. This mill was on the west end of the Gloddfa Ganol site, and in 1987, a short railway was laid to connect the main car park to the mill. It opened for the 1988 season, with three Motor Rail locomotives running passenger trains along this line.

Locomotives

Gallery 
Ex-Gloddfa Ganol locomotives:

Closure 

On 8 October 1997 it was announced that Alfred McAlpine Slate had taken over the Ffestiniog Slate group, including the Oakeley quarry. McAlpines immediately announced that Gloddfa Ganol would close at the end of the year. The majority of the locomotive collection was auctioned in February 1998. By June 1998, only three locomotives remained on the site.

Rich Morris retained his collection of portable industrial monorail equipment, designed by Road Machines (Drayton) Ltd and used for construction projects in the mid 20th century, along with the remains of the Gloddfa Ganol collection: Listers 39005 and 14005, one standard gauge Wickham trolley and Rail Taxi.

Morris died in 2018, and his collection was transferred to the Tanat Valley Light Railway.

See also 
 Llechwedd Slate Caverns
 Ffestiniog Railway

References

External links 
 Photographs of Gloddfa Ganol between 1974 and 1989

Blaenau Ffestiniog
Railway museums in Gwynedd
1974 establishments in Wales
Museums established in 1974
1997 disestablishments in Wales
Museums disestablished in 1997
Mining museums in Gwynedd
Open-air museums in Wales
Defunct museums in the United Kingdom
Slate mines in Gwynedd
Narrow-gauge railway museums in the United Kingdom